The 1981 Austrian Grand Prix was a Formula One motor race held at Österreichring on 16 August 1981. It was the eleventh race of the 1981 Formula One World Championship.

The 53-lap race was won by Frenchman Jacques Laffite, driving a Talbot Ligier-Matra. Compatriot René Arnoux finished second in a Renault, having started from pole position, with Brazilian Nelson Piquet third in a Brabham-Ford. Piquet moved to within six points of Drivers' Championship leader, Argentine Carlos Reutemann, who finished fifth in his Williams-Ford.

Report

Qualifying
In qualifying, just like the previous year, it was an all-French front row; René Arnoux planted his turbocharged Renault on pole, alongside his teammate Alain Prost. Next was Gilles Villeneuve in his turbocharged Ferrari, Jacques Laffite in the Talbot Ligier, Carlos Reutemann and Alan Jones in the Williams cars were 5th and 6th, then Nelson Piquet in a Brabham and then Didier Pironi in the other turbocharged Ferrari.

The Fittipaldi team was not present because they did not have enough engines.

Race
At the start, Villeneuve got the jump on the two Renaults and led into the Hella-Licht chicane. On the next lap, Prost passed Villeneuve into the Hella-Licht; Villeneuve tried to outbrake Prost but he locked up solid and went into some runoff area; as did Reutemann. Both the Canadian and Argentine drivers were able to rejoin, but with time lost.

At the high-speed Österreichring, a power advantage paid dividends. Prost and Arnoux were able to pull away from the rest of the field. Around lap 4, Pironi (who had made a lightning start from 8th on the grid) was running 3rd, and Laffite, Piquet, Jones and eventually Reutemann had caught up to Pironi. None of them could find a way past, and were held up by Pironi for a number of laps. In a similar situation to the Spanish Grand Prix earlier in the year, the Ferrari had more power than any of the cars behind it did, but its handling was way worse; so they were able to stay with the Ferrari. The 5 drivers battled it out, with Piquet, Laffite, Jones and Reutemann keeping with and desperately trying to find a way past Pironi, but not being able to because of the Ferrari's power pulling away on the straights; made more difficult by the fact that the scenic Österreichring was made up almost entirely of long corners and straights.

Villeneuve crashed heavily at the Bosch-Kurve on lap 12, and finally, Laffite, having already passed Piquet, managed to outbrake Pironi into the first of the Texaco bends, and then the rest of the three drivers got by as well. Prost retired from the lead with damaged suspension, and Laffite then charged after Arnoux, passing him at the second of the 2 Texaco Bends. Laffite was to hold the lead until the end, and the poor performance of the Ferrari in relation to other cars meant that Pironi managed to hold up more cars.

Laffite crossed the line, followed by Arnoux, Piquet, Jones, Reutemann (who coasted over the finish line with a dead engine) and John Watson in the carbon-fibre McLaren.

Classification

Qualifying

Race

Championship standings after the race

Drivers' Championship standings

Constructors' Championship standings

References

Austrian Grand Prix
Grand Prix
Austrian Grand Prix
Austrian Grand Prix